Leucopogon cordatus is a small plant in the family Ericaceae and is endemic to Western Australia. Its white flowers may be seen from July to November.  

It was first formally described in 1845 by Otto Wilhelm Sonder in Johann Georg Christian Lehmann's Plantae Preissianae. The specific epithet (cordatus) means "heart-shaped", referring to the leaves.

References 

cordatus
Ericales of Australia
Flora of Western Australia
Plants described in 1845
Taxa named by Otto Wilhelm Sonder